David Augustin Ruiz (born 1973) is a United States district judge of the United States District Court for the Northern District of Ohio. He served as a United States magistrate judge of the same court from 2016 to 2022.

Education 

Ruiz received his Bachelor of Arts from Ohio State University in 1997 and his Juris Doctor from the Ohio State University Moritz College of Law in 2000.

Legal career 

From 2001 to 2003, Ruiz worked in private practice in Pittsburgh, Pennsylvania. From 2003 to 2010, he worked as a senior attorney at Calfee Halter & Griswold in Cleveland. From 2010 to 2016, he served as an Assistant United States Attorney in the Northern District of Ohio. Prior to Ruiz becoming a United States magistrate judge, he served as a pro bono attorney for The Legal Aid Society of Cleveland.

Federal judicial service

United States magistrate judge service 

Ruiz was sworn in as a United States magistrate judge on October 1, 2016. He filled the vacancy left by the retirement of Judge Kenneth S. McHargh on September 30, 2016.

District court service 

On September 30, 2021, President Joe Biden nominated Ruiz to serve as a United States district judge of the United States District Court for the Northern District of Ohio. President Biden nominated Ruiz to the seat vacated by Judge Solomon Oliver Jr., who assumed senior status on February 15, 2021. On November 17, 2021, a hearing on his nomination was held before the Senate Judiciary Committee. On December 16, 2021, his nomination was reported out of committee. On January 3, 2022, his nomination was returned to the President under Rule XXXI, Paragraph 6 of the United States Senate; he was renominated the same day. 

On January 13, 2022, his nomination was reported out of committee by a 14–8 vote. On February 1, 2022, the Senate invoked cloture on his nomination by a 59–38 vote. Later that day, his nomination was confirmed by a 62–35 vote. He received his judicial commission on February 8, 2022. He became the first Hispanic district court judge in Ohio.

See also 
 List of Hispanic/Latino American jurists

References

External links 

1973 births
Living people
20th-century American lawyers
21st-century American judges
21st-century American lawyers
Assistant United States Attorneys
Hispanic and Latino American judges
Hispanic and Latino American lawyers
Judges of the United States District Court for the Northern District of Ohio
Lawyers from Toledo, Ohio
Ohio lawyers
Ohio State University alumni
Ohio State University Moritz College of Law alumni
Pennsylvania lawyers
United States district court judges appointed by Joe Biden
United States magistrate judges